The men's 20 kilometres race walk at the 2014 European Athletics Championships took place at the Letzigrund on 13 August.

Medalists

Records

Schedule

Results

References

Final Results

Race Walk 20 M
Racewalking at the European Athletics Championships